, better known by the stage name  (previously), is a Japanese voice actress from Kyoto. She was a member of Ken Production until 2016.

Filmography

Anime series

Movies and films

OVA
 Virgin Fleet (1998), Satsuki Yukimizawa
 Love Hina Again (2002), Mutsumi Otohime
 Ultra Maniac (2003), Ayu Tateishi
 Hitsuji no Uta (2003), Shou Yaegashi
 Higurashi no Naku Koro ni: Gaiden Nekogoroshi-hen (2007), Mion Sonozaki
 Higurashi no Naku Koro ni Rei (2009), Mion Sonozaki, Shion Sonozaki

Anime CDs

Video games
1996
 Kidou Senshi Gundam: The Blue Destiny, Marion Welch (EXAM System)
 Heroine Dream, Koyomi Tokimori
1998
 Exodus Guilty, Will
 Sound Novel Machi, Shiori Aso
1999
 Kagayaku Kisetsu e, Misaki Kawana
 Seisyoujokantai Virgin Fleet, Satsuku Yukimisawa
 Maboroshi Tsukiyo, Tamako Amano
 SpikeOut: Final Edition, Linda
 Revive... Sosei, Nozomiharu Ogawa
 Langrisser Millennium, Rumati Murph
2000
 Gensou no Artemis: Actress School Mystery Adventure, Aoi Sasamoto
 Karan Koron Gakuen: Doki Doki Hen, Tsukasa Yuuki
 Natsuiro Kenjutsu Komachi, Sagiri Sendo
 Aitakute...Your Smiles in My Heart, Michiru Watase
 Karan Koron Gakuen: Munekyun Hen, Izumi Saki
 Karan Koron Gakuen: Byuarabu Hen, Haruka Hojo
 Love Hina: Ai wa Kotoba no Chuu ni, Mutsumi Otohime
 Love Hina: Totsuzen no Engeji Happening, Mutsumi Otohime
 Love Hina 2: Kotoba wa Konayuki no You ni, Mutsumi Otohime
2001
 21: TwoOne, Yuina Tachibana
 Canary ~Kono Omoi o Uta ni Nosete~, Megumi Chigasaki
 Inuyasha — Kagome Higurashi
2002
 Groove Adventure Rave: Mikan no Hiseki, Cattleya Glory
 Tales of Destiny 2, Limuru, Young Loni
 Inuyasha: Sengoku Otogi Kassen, Kagome Higurashi
 Hikaru no Go: Insei Choujou Kessen, Harumi Ichikawa
 Unlimited Saga, Girl in silver, Jean Moore
2003
 Zone of the Enders: The 2nd Runner, Ken Marinerisu
 Arc the Lad: Twilight of the Spirits, Paulette Van Lloyd
 Ai Yori Aoshi, Tina Foster
 Love Hina Gorgeous: Chiratto Happening!!, Mutsumi Otohime
2004
 Inuyasha: Juso no Kamen, Kagome Higurashi
 Crimson Tears, Asuka
 Futakoi, Miyabi Hinagiku
2005
 Invisible Sign -Isu-, Rin Kimura, Young Makoto Miyake
 Romancing SaGa, Farah, Diana
 Fushigi Yuugi Genbu Kaiden Gaiden -Kagami no Miko-, Takiko Okuda
 Futakoi: Koi to Mizugi no Survival, Miyabi Hinagiku
 Lucky Star: Moe Drill, Patricia Martin
 Tales of the Abyss, Arietta
2006
 Clannad, Misae Sagara
 Mystereet, Aki Fujimichi, Marta Arugerichi
 Blue Blaster, Elsa Lothringen
 Wrestle Angels Survivor, Mimi Yoshiwara, Miyuki Sanada
 Blood+: One Night Kiss, Sayumi Isojima
 High School Girls Game's-High!!, Akari Kōda
 Utawarerumono: Chiriyukusha e no Komoriuta, Soboku
2007
 Zero no Tsukaima: Shou-akuma to Harukaze no Concerto, Haruna Konagi, Akina
 Higurashi no Naku Koro ni Matsuri, Mion Sonozaki, Shion Sonozaki
 Shin Lucky Star Moe Drill: Tabidachi, Patrica Martin
 Hot Shots Golf: Out of Bounds, Lina
2008
 The Legend of Heroes: Trails in the Sky the 3rd, Erica Russell
 Wrestle Angels Survivor 2, Mimi Yoshiwara, Miyuki Sanada
2009
 Chou Gekijouban Keroro Gunsou: Gekishin Dragon Warriors de Arimasu!, Pururukankocho
 Utawarerumono, Sopoku
2010
 Fullmetal Alchemist - Yakusoku no Hi e, Rose
 Another Century's Episode: R, Kaname Chidori
2012
 Zone of the Enders HD Collection, Ken Marinellis
 Saint Seiya Omega: Ultimate Cosmo, Yuna Aquila
2014
 Super Heroine Chronicle, Mion Sonozaki, Shion Sonozaki
2017
 Super Robot Wars V, Kaname Chidori
2018
 Tokyo Afterschool Summoners, Suzuka
2019
Ace Combat 7: Skies Unknown, Avril Mead
2021
Jump Force, Yoruichi Shihōin (DLC)
Girls' Frontline, FX-05 and VP1915
Arknights, Justice Knight

Drama CDs
 7 Seeds (2003), Hana Suguruno
Cyborg 009 Drama CD: Love Stories, Francoise Arnoul
 Hayate Cross Blade, Ayana Mudou
 Inuyasha Jigoku de Matteita Shichinintai, Kagome Higurashi
 Fushigi Yūgi Genbu Kaiden series, Takiko Okuda

References

External links
  
 
 
 Satsuki Yukino on the Radio
 

1966 births
Living people
Japanese video game actresses
Japanese voice actresses
Ken Production voice actors
Voice actresses from Kyoto
20th-century Japanese actresses
21st-century Japanese actresses